Arab Street (Chinese: 阿拉伯街) is an area in Singapore. It was formerly the name of a road in Singapore. It is a historical site in Singapore and is home to popular destionations like the Masjid Sultan mosque, the Projector cinema, and the Malay Heritage Centre.

References

Roads in Singapore
Places in Singapore
Rochor